Autobahn Police Simulator (Autobahn Polizei Simulator in German) is a police driving simulation game developed by Z-Software and published by Aerosoft GmbH. The sequel version of the game was released on December 7, 2017.

The game sets on Germany's highway named Autobahn (Approximately 40 km (25 miles) on the game). The game supports a gaming wheel for it to be more enjoyable and a third-person view or to first-person view. There are 40 missions in the game and free play mode is available. Players can also explore the world in foot and can manually open the vehicle's door. There are male and female characters on the game. There is also realistic radio communications and day and night cycle on the game.

On its gameplay, players will be able to use the "follow me" sign to flag down suspicious cars. Players can secure accidents, inspect truck loads, verifying TÜV (MOT) inspection stickers, and checking for alcohol or drugs.

References 

Driving simulators
IOS games
2015 video games
Video games about police officers
Video games developed in Germany
Windows games